Nahuel Schajris Rodríguez (born July 19, 1974 in Buenos Aires, Argentina) is an Argentine-Mexican singer, songwriter and pianist based in Mexico who experienced chart-topping success as part of the duo Sin Bandera until he and fellow singer and songwriter Leonel García concluded their partnership in 2007. Schajris began his solo career in 2009 with the release of his first full-length solo album Uno No Es Uno, which was received with critical and commercial success, reaching number 10 on Billboards Latin Pop Albums chart and number 27 on Billboards Top Latin Albums chart.

Personal 
Noel moved to Mexico in 1997 and later became a Mexican citizen. He married Karla Goudinoff on 21 April 2002, whom he divorced. On February 22, 2012, he married Panamanian model and TV host Gwendolyn Stevenson, and on September 12, 2013, they became parents of Emma.

He sang a quartet with Luis Fonsi on his 2008 CD "Palabras Del Silencio". This quartet also included artists David Bisbal and Aleks Syntek. In December 2008, Brian McKnight's Christmas album featured Schajris performing a verse in Spanish on the track 'Silent Night.' He's also co-written songs for artists like Alejandro Fernández, Yuridia, Paulina Rubio, Ednita Nazario, Fanny Lu, etc.

Noel recently volunteered in a charity organization called Playing for Change, which accepts donations to help build music schools for underprivileged children. The group records and films musicians from across the planet and posts videos on their website to try and unite the world through music. Noel appeared singing in the upbeat Playing for Change version of the Indian folk song 'Chanda Mama'. He is now a devotee of Sri Amma and Sri Bhagavan. Since his experience in the Oneness Temple, all of Spain and in the European countries have started to know this man.

He considers Ananda Giri from One World Academy as his longtime spiritual mentor and one of his best friends. In 2010, he co-wrote some songs for Diego Torres' studio album Distinto. In March 2011, he was a judge in the television show Pequenos Gigantes.

Discography 
 2004: Cita En Las Nubes
 2009: Uno No Es Uno
 2011: Grandes Canciones
 2014: Verte Nacer

References

External links

[ AMG Biography: Noel Schajris]

1974 births
Living people
Musicians from Buenos Aires
Singers from Buenos Aires
Argentine emigrants to Mexico
Naturalized citizens of Mexico
Argentine people of Ukrainian descent
Argentine people of Spanish descent
Argentine male singer-songwriters
Argentine pianists
Mexican pianists
Sony Music Latin artists
Latin music songwriters
Male pianists
21st-century Argentine male  singers
21st-century pianists